The Scottish Professional Football League (SPFL) consists of four divisions; Scottish Premiership, Scottish Championship, Scottish League One and Scottish League Two. The league structure was established in 2013 after the merger of the Scottish Premier League (SPL) and the Scottish Football League (SFL).

Scottish Premiership

Hat-tricks

Multiple hat-tricks

Scottish Championship
James Keatings became the first player for 43 years to score hat-tricks for both Edinburgh clubs Heart of Midlothian (in 2014) and Hibernian (in 2015). Género Zeefuik of Heart of Midlothian scored a hat-trick in a 10–0 SPFL record win against Cowdenbeath (who also suffered a joint-club record defeat) on 28 February 2015. The three-minute Zeefuik hat-trick equalled the fastest ever hat-trick scored by a Heart of Midlothian player (Andy Black in 1938) in this match too. Kenny Miller became the oldest ever Rangers player to score a hat-trick, with three goals against Dumbarton on 2 January 2016. Mickaël Antoine-Curier and Tony Andreu both scored hat-tricks for Hamilton Academical in the same match, as the club equalled an 82-year-old club record scoreline by beating Greenock Morton 10–2 on the last day of the 2013–14 season.

Hat-tricks

Multiple hat-tricks

Scottish League One

Hat-tricks

Multiple hat-tricks

Scottish League Two
Elgin City's Darryl McHardy and Annan Athletic's Peter Weatherson both scored hat-tricks in the same match in a 5–4 win for Annan Athletic at Elgin City on 25 April 2015. It was also the first hat-trick of McHardy's career.

Hat-tricks

Multiple hat-tricks

SPFL play-offs

Hat-tricks

Notes

 The Scottish Premiership is the top tier of the Scottish Professional Football League (SPFL) and level one of the Scottish football league system. It was established in 2013.

 The Scottish Championship is the second tier of the Scottish Professional Football League (SPFL) and level two of the Scottish football league system. It was established in 2013.

 The Scottish League One is the third tier of the Scottish Professional Football League (SPFL) and level three of the Scottish football league system. It was established in 2013.

 The Scottish League Two is the bottom tier of the Scottish Professional Football League (SPFL) and level four of the Scottish football league system. It was established in 2013.

 The results column shows the home team score first.

 Includes one hat-trick scored in the 2014 Scottish League One play-offs.

 Includes one hat-trick scored in the 2017 Scottish Championship play-offs.

References

Hat-tricks
Hat-tricks
Scottish Professional Football League